Jacob Jan Coenraad Spohler (1837-1894) was a Dutch painter.

He was the son and pupil of Jan Jacob Spohler. He is known for his winter landscapes and cityscapes and was the brother of Johannes Franciscus Spohler.

References

Jacob Jan Coenraad Spohler on Artnet

1837 births
1894 deaths
Dutch male painters
Landscape painters
Painters from Amsterdam
19th-century Dutch painters
19th-century Dutch male artists